"Body Language" (printed as "Body Language ↑⬱") is a 1982 dance/funk song by British rock band Queen. It was written by the band's lead singer Freddie Mercury and was a hit in North America, where it received extensive radio play. However, the single only received a lukewarm response in the United Kingdom. The track was the second single released from their 1982 album Hot Space. The music video for the song was the first one to be banned from MTV for its nudity, despite the members of Queen being fully clothed.

History
The massive success of "Another One Bites the Dust" inspired Queen to temporarily abandon their glam roots in the early 1980s, and experiment with disco, funk and soul music. "Body Language" and its parent album Hot Space were the results of this change. "Body Language" is notable for its near lack of guitar; atmospheric guitar chords sparingly dot the body of the song, while a brief two-note riff is heard during the fade out. The song's key feature was its minimal, sparse production, with the emphasis of "suggestive" lyrics, a "slinky" synth bass (played on an Oberheim OB-X), and writer Freddie Mercury's moans and groans. This song was played twice during the European leg of the Hot Space Tour, with the first performance being in Vienna on 13 May. It often got a lukewarm reaction, although the live arrangement was very different from the studio one. The song was played every night on the U.S leg and the Japanese leg, where the song achieved more commercial success.

The full title of the song, as printed both on the single and Hot Space album sleeve, is "Body Language ↑⬱". The usage and pronunciation of the arrows was never explained by any member of Queen, though the arrows did show up as part of the single's cover art and in its video, where they were painted on the bodies of models, while Freddie Mercury also wore shirts and a white leather jacket during the album's ensuing tour that had similar arrow designs.

The song features a distinctive rhythmic synth bass line as primary sound played by Mercury, making it one of the few band songs not to feature bassist John Deacon on the recording. Brian May only briefly participates on guitar towards the end of the song, being one of his least significant contributions to a Queen single.

Charts

Reaction
The drastic change caused the single to stall at #25 on the UK charts. However, it did far better in the US, where Americans appeared to be a lot more supportive of Queen's forays into dance music. "Body Language" peaked at #11 on the Billboard Hot 100 and number thirty on the soul chart. The B-side is "Life Is Real (Song for Lennon)", this single was released just a little over a year after the assassination of the former Beatle.

In the US the accompanying music video caused a considerable amount of controversy. Due to its erotic undertones plus plentiful skin and sweat, it was deemed unsuitable for a television audience in 1982.

In a Rolling Stone Magazine review, critic John Milward described the song as "a piece of funk that isn't fun".

Popular culture references
"Body Language" was danced to in solo performances by both Blake McGrath and Jessica Fernandez on So You Think You Can Dance. "Body Language" was danced to in the Top 12 performances as a Jazz routine by Pasha Kovalev and Sara Von Gillern on So You Think You Can Dance (Season 3). It was also danced to in Season 12's Top 10 Stage dance.
"Body Language" can be briefly heard in the 1984 documentary film Stripper, being performed to by dancer Sara Costa.
 The song was featured in an episode of Nip/Tuck. 
 The Foo Fighters used "Body Language" in a video promoting the tour for Wasting Light, called "Hot Buns". Dave Grohl stated the song was used in the video, which features the bandmembers dancing naked in a shower, because "it sounds like the soundtrack for a gay porn".

Personnel
Freddie Mercury - lead and backing vocals, synthesizer, drum machine, synth bass
Brian May - electric guitar
Roger Taylor - electronic drums

References

External links
 
 Lyrics at Queen official website

Queen (band) songs
1982 singles
1982 songs
Songs written by Freddie Mercury
Songs about language
Song recordings produced by Reinhold Mack
Elektra Records singles
EMI Records singles
Music video controversies
Obscenity controversies in music
Hollywood Records singles
Funk songs